Malik Pur is a village and union council (an administrative subdivision) of Mansehra District in the Khyber Pakhtunkhwa province of Pakistan. It is located to the north east the district capital Mansehra.

References

Union councils of Mansehra District
Populated places in Mansehra District